Blakiston may refer to:

Blakiston (surname)
Blakiston baronets
Blakiston, South Australia, a small town in South Australia, Australia
Mount Blakiston, Alberta, Canada, named after Thomas Blakiston (1832-1891)
Blakiston, an American medical publisher, later acquired by McGraw-Hill

See also
Blakistons, an Australian haulage and warehousing company